Corning is a city in Clay County, Arkansas, United States. The population was 3,377 at the 2010 census. It is one of the two county seats of Clay County, along with Piggott.

History

The original settlement was approximately one mile east and was called Hecht City, named for brothers Levi and Solomon Hecht, who operated a lumber mill on Black River. Hecht City moved to the present site of Corning in 1871, when the Cairo and Fulton Railroad surveyed the land for the proposed route. The railroad through the settlement was completed by 1872. On February 5, 1873, the name was changed from Hecht City to Corning, in honor of H. D. Corning, an engineer with the railroad.

The city of Corning experienced a massive period of growth in the early part of the 20th century. In the 1960s and 1970s, it was the site of many industrial manufacturing developments.

Corning was the site of a large explosion on March 9, 1966. The pre-dawn explosion originated in a munitions railcar and resulted in only one minor injury in the small town. The explosion was widely reported throughout the surrounding region.

Two properties in Corning are listed on the National Register of Historic Places: Sheeks House and Oliver House.

Geography
U.S. Route 62 passes through the city, leading east  to Piggott and southwest  to Pocahontas. U.S. Route 67 leads north from Corning  to Poplar Bluff, Missouri, and joins US 62 heading southwest out of Corning to Pocahontas.

The topography of Corning is flat, having previously been marshland. Area farmers and builders may attest to this due to the proliferation of gumbo soil, a name given to soil high in clay particulate matter and common in the region.

Climate
The climate in this area is characterized by hot, humid summers and generally mild to cold winters. According to the Köppen Climate Classification system, Corning has a humid subtropical climate, abbreviated "Cfa" on climate maps.

According to the Köppen Climate Classification system, has a humid subtropical climate, abbreviated "Cfa" on climate maps.

On January 22, 1918, Corning set the record for the highest 24-hour snowfall recorded in Arkansas at 25 inches.

Demographics

2020 census

As of the 2020 United States census, there were 3,227 people, 1,421 households, and 934 families residing in the city.

2000 census
As of the census of 2000, there were 3,679 people, 1,553 households, and 1,018 families residing in the city. The racial makeup of the city was 97.77% White, 0.33% Black or African American, 0.60% Native American, 0.24% Asian, 0.11% from other races, and 0.95% from two or more races. 0.38% of the population was Hispanic or Latino of any race.

There were 1,553 households, out of which 27.9% had children under the age of 18 living with them, 51.6% were married couples living together, 10.5% had a female householder with no husband present, and 34.4% were non-families. 30.7% of all households were made up of individuals, and 18.2% had someone living alone who was 65 years of age or older. The average household size was 2.32, and the average family size was 2.88.

In the city, the population was spread out, with 23.3% under the age of 18, 8.9% from 18 to 24, 25.9% from 25 to 44, 22.0% from 45 to 64, and 19.9% who were 65 years of age or older. The median age was 39 years. For every 100 females, there were 88.8 males. For every 100 females age 18 and over, there were 82.5 males.

The median income for a household in the city was $21,200, and the median income for a family was $29,485. Males had a median income of $22,095 versus $16,383 for females. The per capita income for the city was $12,953. About 18.9% of families and 23.2% of the population were below the poverty line, including 29.0% of those under age 18 and 29.6% of those age 65 or over.

Education
Public education for elementary and secondary students is provided by the Corning School District. Corning High School is a member of the Arkansas Activities Association. Programs include Art, Band, Spanish, Computer Tech, and Family and Consumer Sciences, along with other basic classes provided by public schools in the state. The school district’s mascot is the bobcat.

Corning has always prided itself on its high school sports programs. Currently, the school has boys' football, track, basketball, golf, baseball, and trap shooting. Girls' programs include basketball, softball, track, and golf. The high school football program has enjoyed dominance at times, such as when the team went undefeated in 2007 and made it to the second round of the state playoffs. Also successful, the varsity girls' basketball team played in the state Division 3A playoffs in 2009, 2010, and 2011.

Agriculture
Industry in Corning is dominated by agriculture-related industries, such as farm equipment sales, farm equipment repair, seed processing and sales, and fertilizer and chemicals production. Forestry was a primary industry in the late 1800s and into the early 1900s but gave way to farming of rice, soybeans, hard red winter wheat, corn and other grains.

Notable people
 Jack Ladyman, Republican member of the Arkansas House of Representatives from Jonesboro; former Corning resident
 W. Stephen Smith, Northwestern University Professor of Voice; voice teacher and author

References

External links

 City of Corning official website
 Encyclopedia of Arkansas History & Culture entry: Corning (Clay County)

Cities in Clay County, Arkansas
Cities in Arkansas
County seats in Arkansas
Populated places established in 1877
1877 establishments in Arkansas